The 1936 football (soccer) season was the 35th season of competitive football in Brazil.

Campeonato Paulista

In 1936, there were two different editions of the Campeonato Paulista. One was organized by the Associação Paulista de Esportes Atléticos (APEA) while the other one was organized by the Liga Paulista de Foot-Ball (LPF).

APEA's Campeonato Paulista

Final Standings

Portuguesa declared as the APEA's Campeonato Paulista champions.

LPF's Campeonato Paulista

The LPF's Campeonato Paulista final was played between Palestra Itália-SP and Corinthians.

Palestra Itália-SP declared as the LPF's Campeonato Paulista champions by aggregate score of 3-1.

Campeonato Carioca

In 1936, there were two different editions of the Campeonato Carioca. One was organized by the Federação Metropolitana de Desportos (FMD) while the other one was organized by the Liga Carioca de Foot-Ball (LCF).

FMD's Campeonato Carioca

The FMD's Campeonato Carioca final was played between Vasco da Gama and Madureira.

Vasco da Gama declared as the FMD's Campeonato Carioca champions by the aggregate score of 4-3.

LCF's Campeonato Carioca

The LCF's Campeonato Carioca final was played between Fluminense and Flamengo.

Fluminense declared as the LCF's Campeonato Carioca champions by the aggregate score of 7-4.

State championship champions

Other competition champions

Brazil national team
The following table lists all the games played by the Brazil national football team in official competitions and friendly matches during 1936.

References

 Brazilian competitions at RSSSF
 1936 Brazil national team matches at RSSSF

 
Seasons in Brazilian football
Brazil